A disease-modifying treatment, disease-modifying drug, or disease-modifying therapy is a treatment that delays or slows the progression of a disease by targeting its underlying cause. They are distinguished from symptomatic treatments that treat the symptoms of a disease but do not address its underlying cause.

Examples 
 Disease-modifying osteoarthritis drug
 Disease-modifying antirheumatic drug

References 

Medical treatments
Medical terminology